Tajareh or Tajreh or Tejrah may refer to:

Tajreh, Hamadan
Tajareh, Barzok, Kashan County, Isfahan Province
Tajareh, Neyasar, Kashan County, Isfahan Province
Tajareh, Khvansar, Isfahan Province
Tajareh, Saveh, Markazi Province
Tajareh, Shazand, Markazi Province
Tajareh, Tehran
Tajareh Sadat
Tajareh Sar Ab-e Sadat
Tajareh-ye Galehdar